"Love Is a Drug" is a song by Irish singer and songwriter and former member of Westlife Markus Feehily. The song was released in the United Kingdom as a digital download On 19 April 2015 through Harmoney Entertainment. It was released as the lead single from his debut studio album Fire (2015). The song was written by Markus Feehily, Steve Anderson and Tinashé Fazakerley; and produced by Mojam. The song peaked at number 65 on the Irish Singles Chart and number 56 on the UK Singles Chart.

Background
After Westlife split up in June 2012 Markus launched his solo career, in February 2015 he debuted his debut single on RTÉ 2fm in Ireland. The next day the track premiered online, via Wonderland Magazine. Moments after the premiere of the song, it was made available for pre-order on iTunes. In an interview with Digital Spy talking about the song, Markus said "If I ever went to write a Westlife song, you be like, 'Oh let's do this kind of beat' or whatever, and it would just never be a Westlife song if it had that beat. [...] When Westlife finished, the rule book was thrown out of the window in terms of songwriting. I took away all the formulas and just went hell for leather at it. 'Love Is A Drug' is one of the examples of what came out when I did that." It was written by Steve Anderson, Markus Feehliy and Tinashe Fazerkely. Produced by MoJam and Steve Anderson, Mixed by Jeremy Wheatley and strings/choirs arranged by Cliff Masterson.

Music video
A music video to accompany the release of "Love Is a Drug" was first released onto YouTube on 4 March 2015 at a total length of three minutes and thirty-nine seconds. The video was directed by Naroop Jhooti.

Track listing

Charts

Release history

References

2015 songs
2015 debut singles
Markus Feehily songs
Songs written by Steve Anderson (musician)
Songs written by Markus Feehily
Song recordings produced by Mojam